The International Academy of Architecture - a non-profit-making company for performing activities for private benefit (IAA) is a non-governmental and non-profit organization with special status in the United Nations Economic and Social Council (UN ECOSOC), located in Sofia, Bulgaria.

The Bulgarian name is also used besides the English translation in all documents for use in Bulgaria. Working languages are English, French, Russian and Spanish. Members of the IAA are leading academicians and faculties from all over the world.

References

External links
Official website of the International Academy of Architecture

Architecture organizations
International organizations based in Europe
Scientific organizations based in Bulgaria
Organizations based in Sofia
Education in Sofia